Joseph Adrian Montemurro (born 13 September 1969) is an Australian soccer coach and former player who is the head coach of Italian club Juventus Women.

Montemurro played as a midfielder during his short playing career, mainly in Italy, before returning to Australia to play in the Victorian state leagues. He began coaching in youth football for various Victorian clubs, before his first managerial role with Sunshine George Cross, and then later, Coburg United. His first job abroad came in 2013, spending four months as the inaugural manager of Papua New Guinean side Port Moresby. From 2014 to 2017, he managed the women's sides of Melbourne Victory and Melbourne City, and then replaced Pedro Martínez Losa as manager of Arsenal, where he won the league title in his second season with the club. In 2021, Montemurro moved to Italy to join Juventus Women.

Playing career
Montemurro spent his entire junior playing career at Brunswick Juventus and made his first senior appearance for the club in 1986 in the National Soccer League as a 16-year-old. He was also a member of the Victorian State Youth team between 1986–88 which won two national titles.
 
In 1987, he was offered a scholarship at the Australian Institute of Sport which he declined to remain at Brunswick Juventus. In 1988, he was spotted by Swiss club Neuchatel Xamax and offered the opportunity to remain in Europe. From there he passed onto Italian Serie C2 club Potenza before spending the bulk of his career at Opitergina, in the Italian non-professional Leagues.

He returned to Australia in 1996 and resumed playing in the Victorian State leagues while embarking on his coaching education.

Managerial career

Early years coaching in Victoria
His first coaching positions commenced at his former junior club Brunswick Juventus. His first major role was as youth coach (U21) in the Victorian Premier league with Green Gully in which he took the team to the runner-up position in his first year.

In the 2002–03 season Montemurro took over the youth team at Melbourne Knights in the National Soccer League, in which he guided the team to a Southern Division Championship. The team lost the playoff to become National Youth Champions. The demise of the National League came and the club offered Montemurro the senior position in the Victorian Premier League. He opted to continue his youth coaching at cross town rivals South Melbourne in which he guided the team to the runner-up position in 2005.

Mid 2006, with the team sitting clear at the top of the ladder, Montemurro was approached by Sunshine George Cross to take over the first team and save it from relegation. He succeeded and continued his position until mid 2007, when he parted ways with the club. His next role was head coach of Coburg United in Victorian State League 1 in which he guided the club to its first ever promotion to top flight football in the club's 30-year history.

In 2010, he returned to South Melbourne as a youth coach and guided the team to a historic undefeated season as champions. He was promoted to assistant senior coach at South, in which VPL finals appearances and the quarter finals of the Singapore Cup were achievements during his tenure. During 2013, he took over new franchise club Port Moresby in the Papua New Guinea National Soccer League. The club finished third in the league, qualifying for the championship playoffs, where they reached the final, only to lose 3–0 to Hekari United.

Melbourne Victory and Melbourne City
In 2014, he returned to Melbourne and was appointed National Training Centre head coach for women's football in Victoria. Montemurro was appointed head coach of the Melbourne Victory FC W-League on 16 May 2014 and guided it to the runner-up position after the home and away fixture, the highest finish in the club's history. The team lost the semi-final playoff on penalties to Canberra United.

After the 2014 season, Montemurro left Victory to join Melbourne City taking up a position as the manager of their youth side. Following City joining the W-League, Montemurro was appointed as head coach of their women's side. In its maiden season, the City women were crowned 2015–16 W-League Premiers. On 31 January 2016, City completed the double by defeating Sydney 4–1. W-League history was created as the team went the entire season undefeated, amassing 42 goals scored and 5 conceded.

In June 2016, Montemurro's role at City was expanded to include assisting John van 't Schip with the senior men's team. His responsibilities changed in January 2017, becoming City's chief assistant coach under new manager Michael Valkanis, relinquishing his W-League coaching role as a result.

Arsenal Women
In November 2017, Montemurro left Melbourne City to join Arsenal Women as manager, after Pedro Martínez Losa was sacked following a poor start to the season. On 14 March 2018, he won his first major trophy with Arsenal by beating Manchester City 1–0 to win the FA Women's League Cup. On 15 May 2018, he led Arsenal to the Women's FA Cup final in front of a record attendance of 45,423 at Wembley Stadium, in which they lost 3–1 to Chelsea.

In August 2018, in his first full preseason in charge of Arsenal Women, the team were crowned champions of the Toulouse International Ladies Cup, beating UEFA Women's Champions League quarter-finalists Montpellier and holding Paris Saint Germain to a 2–2 draw.

In the 2018–19 season, Arsenal became the first FA WSL team to win 9 games straight, amassing 42 goals and conceding 5. The winning streak came to an end when an injury stricken squad lost away to Manchester City. The attacking style and fluidity of possession instilled by Montemurro won many accolades. On 7 February 2019, the team reached its second consecutive Continental Cup League final, beating Manchester United 2–1 at Meadow Park. After a scoreless draw in the final at Sheffield's Bramall Lane, the team was defeated 4–2 in a penalty shoot out against Manchester City. In the same month, Montemurro was nominated for Manager of the Year at the London Football Awards, alongside Maurizio Sarri and Mauricio Pochettino; he was the first coach from the WSL to be nominated for the Awards. On 31 March, Arsenal qualified for the UEFA Women's Champions League after a five year absence, with a 1–0 win over Birmingham City. In front of a record WSL crowd against Brighton & Hove Albion at the Falmer Stadium, goals from Vivianne Miedema, Katie McCabe, Beth Mead and Daniëlle van de Donk, secured the WSL title with a round in advance; it was Arsenal's first title since 2012. The season was also capped off with Montemurro winning the WSL League Managers Association (LMA) Coach of the Year.

In July 2019, Montemurro was nominated as FIFA World Women's Coach of the year. The 2019–20 season saw Arsenal continue in the same fashion as the previous season, having qualified for the quarter-finals of the UEFA Champions League. The team was also part of a record-breaking WSL attendance, when 38,200 spectators came to watch the first ever North London Derby at Tottenham Stadium; Arsenal won the match 2–0. Another record was broken on 1 December 2019, when they beat Bristol 11–1 at Meadow Park, the highest winning margin in the WSL. In March 2021, it was announced that Joe was to leave the club at the end of the 2020–21 season. Despite retaining the support of the Arsenal board, Montemurro decided to leave the club in order to take a break and spend more time with his family. He left the club having qualified for the 2021–22 UEFA Women's Champions League.

Juventus Women 
On 8 June 2021, Montemurro was appointed head coach of Italian Serie A side Juventus Women. Montemurro's first official match as Juventus' manager came on 18 August, in a 12–0 win against North Macedonian side Kamenica Sasa in the semi-finals of the first round of UEFA Women's Champions League. Montemurro's first trophy as Juventus coach came, the Supercoppa Italiana on 8 January 2022 after a 2–1 win against AC Milan. The team went on to win the Serie A and Italian Cup completing the clubs first ever treble winning season. The biggest achievement for the team in the 21/22 season was qualification to the quarter finals stage of the UEFA Women's Champions League. Grouped with Chelsea, Wolfburg and Servette, the teams 2-0 win Germany and the 0-0 draw in London earned the team second spot in group A and effectively knocking out Chelsea. The team won the first leg of the quarter final v Lyon 2-1 at the Allianz stadium in Turin but lost 3-1 at the Groupama Stadium in Lyon.

Personal life
Montemurro is married, and has two children with his wife Linda. He is of Italian descent as his family moved from southern Italy to settle in Australia, following the end of World War II. Montemurro became an Arsenal supporter at the age of seven, when his brother returned home with a replica kit. The 1979 FA Cup Final, in which Arsenal beat Manchester United 3–2, served as an inspiration for Montemurro to pursue a career in football.

In 2010, he completed his UEFA A license at Coverciano, via the Italian Football Federation (FIGC). He also completed his UEFA Pro License at Coverciano in July 2014, and is a member of the Italian Coaches Association (AIAC). He also holds an AFC/FFA A License and completed the Master of Sports Coaching degree at the University of Queensland. He is also undertaking a PhD at the University of Loughborough with a focus on Sports Psychology Performance.

Career statistics

Manager

Honours

Manager
Melbourne City Women
 W-League Premier: 2015–16
 W-League Champion: 2015–16, 2016–17

Arsenal Women
 FA Women's Super League: 2018–19
 FA Women's League Cup: 2017–18; runner-up: 2018–19, 2019–20
FA Women's Cup runner-up: 2017–18

Juventus Women
 Serie A: 2021–22
 Coppa Italia: 
 Supercoppa Italiana: 2021–22. Runner-up: 2022-2023

Individual
 LMA Manager of the Month (WSL): October 2018, March 2019 December 2019, October 2020, March 2021, April 2021
 League Managers Association Manager of the Year 2018\2019
 The Best FIFA Football Coach nominee: 2019
 UEFA Women's Coach of the Year nominee: 2019–20
 London Football Awards Manager of the Year nominee: 2019, 2020
 2021-22 - FIGC "Panchina Doro" Serie A Femminile Manager of the Year

References

1969 births
Living people
Australian soccer players
Australian soccer coaches
Australian expatriate sportspeople in Switzerland
Australian expatriate sportspeople in England
Potenza S.C. players
Melbourne City FC non-playing staff
Arsenal W.F.C. managers
Juventus F.C. (women) managers
National Soccer League (Australia) players
A-League Women managers
Women's Super League managers
Serie A (women's football) managers
Association football midfielders
Australian people of Italian descent
Australian expatriate sportspeople in Italy
Australian expatriate soccer coaches
Soccer players from Melbourne
Expatriate footballers in Switzerland